Qazi Ataullah Khan (1895-1952) was a Pashtun lawyer, writer, activist, and politician.

Early life and education
Qazi Ataullah Khan was born in 1895 in the Landi Yarghajo village of Peshawar, then a city of British India. He was the second son of Qazi Nasrullah Khan, a teacher and religious scholar. Being natives to Landi Yarghajo, his family is Khalil and Mohmand by caste. Qazi was the title given to Qazi Ataullah's great-grandfather, Qazi (Haji) Talibuddin Rohani. Qazi Ataullah received his initial education in a local religious madrassa of his village before attending the Mission School Peshawar where his father previously taught. He pursued a degree in law from Aligarh Muslim University and graduated in 1918. He then returned to Peshawar.

Career and activism
In 1919, Qazi Ataullah attended a Pashtun rights rally held by Abdul Ghaffar Khan in Charsadda. By 1921, he was Ghaffar Khan's aid and close associate. In 1925, after practicing law in Peshawar for several years, Qazi Ataullah settled in Mardan. He continued to practice law while also working with Ghaffar Khan in the non-violent Society for the Reformation of Afghans/Pashtoons (Anjuman-e-Islah-e Afghania).

According to Ajmal Khattak, Qazi Ataullah proposed renaming the organization Khudai Khidmatgar upon its formation in 1929 following the Qissa Khwani massacre. In 1930, the British arrested him for his work in the Pashun rights group; he was imprisoned for five years. When the political party the Frontier National Congress (an offshoot of the Indian National Congress) in 1937, Qazi Ataullah became a member of the legislative assembly as well as the Minister of Revenue under Dr. Khan Sahib. In 1946, the Congress was again victorious and Qazi Ataullah became the Minister of Education. He was in office when the first education policy in Khyber Pakhtunkhwa was passed.

The following year, the Muslim League called for a referendum for residents of Khyber Pakhtunkhwa to opt for either Pakistan or India. The Congress opposed them, saying that the 1946 election results showed their preference for a united India, and that the referendum was illegal. When they were ignored, When they were ignored, the Pukhtoonkhwa chapter of congress headed by Dr. Khan Sahib gave another option on 23 June 1947 that was to either opt for Pakistan or for Pukhtoonistan. This was the first time that the Pukhtoonistan chapter had been put up formally in an assembly session and that was done by Qazi Ataullah Khan. These efforts also ended in vain and thus, congress boycotted the referendum. Pakistan declared its independence on 14 August 1947. 

In June 1948, Qazi Ataullah, along with Ghaffar Khan and other Khudai Khidmatgar leaders were put in jail and their property was confiscated In July 1948, the Khudai Khidmat movement was made illegal. by the Muslim League, whose government was under the region's Chief Minister Abdul Qayyum Khan. Qazi Ataullah was first in D. I. Khan Prison before being transferred to Hyderabad. While in prison, he wrote the four volume history book "History of the Pukhtoons", written in Pashto and making him the first Pashtun writer to write about Pashtun history. He was later sent to Macch Prison, where Khan Abdul Wali Khan, Abdul Aziz Khan, Arbab Abdul Ghafoor Khan, and Amir Muhammad Khan were imprisoned.

Illness and death
Qazi Ataullah's health began deteriorating but he was denied medical care by the government. He was later diagnosed with blood cancer. When his condition became critical in February 1952, he was sent to Lahore's Mayo Hospital. He died not long after, on 17 February 1952. He was buried in Mardan.

Following his death, he was known among Pashtun activists as Ghazi Qazi "due to his unrelenting struggle for the rights of Pukhtoons til his last breath and the way the Muslim League government under the leadership of Qayyum Khan had declined him all medical facilities in prison." According to journalist Sorash Kashmiri, Qazi Ataullah's final words were: "Working for the well being of Pukhtoons is our foremost priority and is our firm belief. We are the sons of this soil and we have given our lives for this land, then why is our soil and land still in turmoil. I am not upset because my life is about to end but it pains me when I think that I will not be able to serve my people anymore and that my lifelong struggle for the people will end halfway."

Personal life
Qazi Ataullah married the daughter of the Khans of Prang lineage in 1923. She was the niece of the then-Sahib e Haq. The couple had 3 sons and 5 daughters, one of whom was Anwar Sadullah. One of Qazi Ataullah's brothers, Matiullah, lived in England. Activist Shandana Humayun Khan is his great-granddaughter.

References

1895 births
1952 deaths
Pakistani politicians
Pashtun people
Pashto-language writers
Pashtun writers
Pashtun rights activists
20th-century Pakistani people
20th-century Pakistani lawyers
20th-century Pakistani writers
20th-century Pakistani male writers
Pakistani activists
Pakistani human rights activists
People from Peshawar
Qazi family
People from Khyber District
Aligarh Muslim University alumni
Faculty of Law, Aligarh Muslim University alumni
People from Mardan District
People from Khyber Pakhtunkhwa
Politicians from Khyber Pakhtunkhwa
Khyber Pakhtunkhwa politicians
Pashtun nationalists